Mbaba Mwana Waresa is a fertility goddess of the Zulu religion of Southern Africa.  She rules over rainbows, agriculture, harvests, rain, and beer and has power over water and earth.  She taught her people how to sow and reap and also the art of making beer. It is this act that has made her one of the more revered goddesses of the Zulu people.

Description
Mbaba Mwana Waresa lives in the clouds, in a round hut made of rainbow arches. Whenever is heard the telltale sound of her thunder drum, people know that she is pouring much-needed waters from her heavenly home. She is the daughter of the sky god Umvelinqangi.
She is able to shapeshift her appearance to that of an animal, hence her other name, Nomkhubulwane, which means "She who chooses the state of an animal".

According to legend, Mbaba Mwana Waresa was unable to find a suitable husband in the heavens, so she scoured the land in search of a mortal husband, and then defied the other gods when she fell in love with a mortal man.  In order to make sure he loved her, she tested him by sending a beautiful bride in her place while she disguised herself as a hag.  Her earthly lover was not fooled and recognized her immediately. They married and to this day, they live in her rainbow-covered house in the sky.

Worship
The Zulu call on her when they need guidance to make an important decision.

References

Zulu goddesses
Zulu mythology
Fertility goddesses
Agricultural goddesses
Alcohol goddesses
Sky and weather goddesses
Rain deities